Zygmunt Buhl (24 January 1927 – 28 September 1978) was a Polish sprinter. He competed in the men's 4 × 100 metres relay at the 1952 Summer Olympics.

References

1927 births
1978 deaths
Athletes (track and field) at the 1952 Summer Olympics
Polish male sprinters
Olympic athletes of Poland
Place of birth missing
20th-century Polish people